The Double Sunrise service was formed in 1943 to re-establish the Australia–England air link that had been cut due to the fall of Singapore in 1942. The service initially operated from its base in Nedlands, Western Australia near Perth, to the Royal Air Force base at Lake Koggala near Galle in Ceylon (now Sri Lanka). It was later extended to Karachi in British India (now part of Pakistan), which was the terminus for the BOAC service from England. The name of the service was derived from the crew and passengers observing two sunrises on each flight.

History
In 1943, Royal Australian Air Force personnel were seconded to operate Consolidated PBY Catalina seaplane aircraft under the banner of Qantas. The plan called for flights between Crawley, Western Australia, and RAF Base Koggala in southern Ceylon. Navigating without the aid of radio, the crews relied solely on rudimentary navigation by compass and stars during the trip. Five aircraft obtained under Lend-Lease were supplied by the British Air Ministry, and were named after stars used for navigation en route: Rigel Star, Spica Star, Altair Star, Vega Star and Antares Star. The first flight took place on 29 July 1943.

Taking between 27 and 33 hours, with departure timed so that the flight crossed Japanese occupied territory during darkness, the crews would observe the sunrise twice, which led to the service being known as "The Double Sunrise". After the success of the initial flights, it was decided to run a weekly service, with some services flying over Rottnest Island and then taking a direct line to Galle. As part of the Australia-England air route there was a surface component from Galle to Karachi that added considerable time to the service. This was later replaced by the Double Sunrise service, with Karachi to England flown by BOAC. Air crews would change in Galle taking the next plane in either direction minimizing the time taken to complete the journey.

Starting in June 1944, Qantas augmented the Catalinas with the first of two converted Consolidated Liberator bombers. The route was named Kangaroo Service and marked the first time that Qantas's now-famous Kangaroo logo was used; passengers received a certificate proclaiming them as members of The Order of the Longest Hop.

In June 1945, Avro Lancastrians were introduced on the England–Australia service, and the Liberators and Catalinas were soon shifted to other Qantas routes. Double Sunrise service ended on 18 July 1945. After the war, in accordance with the terms of the Lend-Lease agreement, the five modified Catalinas that had flown The Double Sunrise service were scuttled.

The Double Sunrise flights remain the longest (in terms of airtime) commercial flights in history.

Secret Order of the Double Sunrise

The Secret Order of the Double Sunrise was an illustrated certificate given to passengers aboard the flying boats of the Australia–England air link, to attest they had been airborne for more than 24 hours.

Documentary film
In 2013, a documentary film was made to celebrate the 70th anniversary of the Double Sunrise flights. The film features 93-year-old Rex Senior who is the last remaining pilot. The film was released on Qantas Inflight globally and on DVD.

References

Roger Thiedeman (27 February 2007). "Koggala, Catalinas, and the double sunrise". The Sunday Times. Colombo, Sri Lanka. Retrieved 15 February 2009.

Roger Thiedeman: http://serendib.btoptions.lk/article.php?issue=103&id=2441

Notes
Rex Senior was the 1st Officer & Navigator on the first service, he was also on the crew for many of the subsequent flights, serving with the unit until march 1944. 
1. Flight information is from Rex Senior's recollections there is no reference to official documentation for verification.

Further reading

External links
 Official Documentary Film Website The Double Sunrise Flights Official Film Website
 Double Sunrise flight by Rex Clifton Senior(1st Officer & navigator on the first official flight)
 Qantas Web site
 Australian War memorial interview — Interview with Captain R. J. "Bert" Ritchie AO CBE (By the seats of their pants) 27 October 1987; 58 minutes

20th-century aviation
1943 establishments
Crawley, Western Australia
Commercial flights
1945 disestablishments in Australia
Airline routes